qpsmtpd is an SMTP daemon written in Perl. It was originally designed to be a drop-in replacement for qmail-smtpd, the SMTP component of qmail, and it is now also compatible with Postfix, Exim, sendmail and virtually any software that "speaks SMTP".  It has a flexible plugin system, making it easy to interoperate with other pieces in a mail system.

Its main purpose is to allow mail administrators to perform more advanced spam filtering than is possible with other SMTP daemons. As one example of dozens, the earlytalker plugin blocks many viruses and mass mailers based on their characteristic violation of basic protocol, even before they start sending mail data.

The program's main author is Ask Bjørn Hansen.  It is licensed under the MIT License.

Qpsmtpd Plugins 

A defining virtue of qpsmtpd is its plugin system and collection of plugins. In addition to basic plugins qpsmtpd has a suite of additional plugins that provide integration with external mail filters and processors as well as implementations of many email technologies. The following list is just a few of the many qpsmtpd plugins.

See also

 Anti-Spam SMTP Proxy

Further reading
 Using qpsmtpd
 TechTarget article on qpsmtpd
 Using qpsmtpd for traps.spamassassin.org

External links
 - Qpsmtpd Web site
 qpsmtpd wiki
 Ohloh page
 

Free software programmed in Perl
Message transfer agents
Perl software
Software using the MIT license